Events from the year 1782 in Sweden

Incumbents
 Monarch – Gustav III

Events

 27 May - Jewish immigration to Sweden is legalized.
 19 September - Inauguration of the new building of the Stenborg Theatre in Stockholm. 
 30 September - The Royal Swedish Opera relocates from Bollhuset to a new modern opera house, which is inaugurated with Cora och Alonzo by Johann Gottlieb Naumann. 
 - A Catholic church is opened in Stockholm. 
 - Hydrogen cyanide discovered by Carl Wilhelm Scheele.
 - Elisabeth Olin inducted to the Royal Swedish Academy of Music.
 - Elsa Fougt becomes the manager of the Royal printing press.

Births

 6 February - Gertrud Ahlgren, cunning woman and natural healer (died 1874)
 8 February - Malla Silfverstolpe, salonnière  (died 1861)
 13 May – Johan Gustaf Sandberg, painter  (died 1854)
 13 November - Esaias Tegnér, poet  (died 1846)

Deaths

 13 May  – Daniel Solander, naturalist and an apostle of Carl Linnaeus, (born 1733)
 16 July - Queen Dowager Louisa Ulrika, queen dowager (born 1720)
 - Elisabeth Christina von Linné, scientist (born 1743)

References

 
Years of the 18th century in Sweden
Sweden